Kalin Terziyski is a contemporary Bulgarian writer.

Educated as a psychiatrist, out of necessity for additional loan due to the low wages for young doctors in his home Bulgaria, he started writing in for newspapers and magazines. At the beginning of 2000, he dismissed his medical career and devoted his creative time to writing.

He was one of the winners of the European Union Prize for Literature 2011.

Works

Poetry 
 "Salt", Sofia, Paradox, 2008, 108 pages. The ISBN on Bulgarian bookstore sites (9789545530844) is formally wrong.
 "New poems at the very beginning", Sofia, Faber, 2010, 72 pages. 
 "The advantages of posing", Sofia, Ciela, 2011, 96 pages,

Short stories 
 "13 pieces of broken time", 2008 : There are only 100 pieces for the whole edition. Each book is separately illustrated by the author. Price 60 euro. Not available commercially.
 "Strict thoughts with strange dressing", Sofia, Ciela, 2009, 98 p.
 "Is there anybody to love you", Plovdiv, Janet 45, 2009, 160 p.
 "Love of a 35 year old woman", Plovdiv, Janet 45, 2010, 160 p.
 "There is a day for the good man", Plovdiv, Janet 45, 2011, 142 p.
 "Noah gives the last orders to the animals", Sofia, Ciela, 2012, 120 p.

Novels 
 "Alcohol", Sofia, Ciela, 2010, 352 p.
 "Insanity", Sofia, Ciela, 2011, 240 p.

References

External links 
 Biography - Kalin Terziyski, euprizeliterature.eu
 Trailer - Theater play based on his novel 'Alcochol'

Bulgarian writers
Living people
1970 births